Ibrahim IV was a titled Sultan of the Kanuri state of Bornu from 1820-1846. He was one of the last rulers from the Sefawa ruling dynasty.

Life 
Ibrahim's father, and previous ruler of Bornu, had called on Muhammad al-Amin al-Kanemi or El-Kanemi, an Islamic scholar and warrior, to help him fight against the Fulanis and their leader Goni Mukhtar. The two were able to push back the Fulanis from much of Bornu. In the process, El-Kanemi grew powerful and was a threat to the ruling Sefawa dynasty which had produced Ibrahim and his father, Dunama IX Lefiami. Dunama was later killed in a failed putsch to murder El-Kanemi. His son, Ibrahim succeeded him. 

When El-Kanemi died in 1837, he was succeeded by his son, Umar. Ibrahim and Umar became enmeshed in a battle of supremacy and they renewed hostilities between the Kanemis and the Sefawas. Ibrahim hatched a plan to kill Umar by inviting an external army from Wadai under the command of the Sultan of Wadai. However, Umar knew about the plan before had and killed Ibrahim before fleeing Bornu, continuing the assault on the Safawa dynasty.

Rulers of the Bornu Empire
19th-century monarchs in Africa